The 110th New York State Legislature, consisting of the New York State Senate and the New York State Assembly, met from January 4 to May 26, 1887, during the third year of David B. Hill's governorship, in Albany.

Background
Under the provisions of the New York Constitution of 1846, 32 Senators and 128 assemblymen were elected in single-seat districts; senators for a two-year term, assemblymen for a one-year term. The senatorial districts were made up of entire counties, except New York County (seven districts) and Kings County (three districts). The Assembly districts were made up of entire towns, or city wards, forming a contiguous area, all within the same county.

At this time there were two major political parties: the Democratic Party and the Republican Party. In New York City the three Democratic factions (Tammany Hall, "Irving Hall" and the "County Democrats") re-united, and nominated joint candidates in most districts. The Prohibition Party and the Greenback Party also nominated tickets.

Elections
The New York state election, 1886 was held on November 2. The only statewide elective offices up for election was carried by a Democrat. The approximate party strength at this election, as expressed by the vote for Judge of the Court of Appeals, was: Democrats 468,000; Republicans 461,000; Prohibition 36,000; and Greenback 2,000.

Sessions
The Legislature met for the regular session at the State Capitol in Albany on January 4, 1887; and adjourned on May 26.

James W. Husted (R) was re-elected Speaker.

On January 20, the Legislature elected Frank Hiscock (R) to succeed Warner Miller (R) as U.S. Senator from New York, for a six-year term beginning on March 4, 1887.

State Senate

Districts

Note: There are now 62 counties in the State of New York. Modern-day Nassau County was part of Queens County, and modern-day Bronx County was divided between New York County west of the Bronx River and Westchester County east of it.

Members
The asterisk (*) denotes members of the previous Legislature who continued in office as members of this Legislature.

Employees
 Clerk: John W. Vrooman
 Assistant Clerk: John S. Kenyon
 Sergeant-at-Arms: James C. Murray
 Doorkeeper: John H. Houck
 Stenographer: Harris A. Corell

State Assembly

Assemblymen
The asterisk (*) denotes members of the previous Legislature who continued as members of this Legislature.

Employees
 Clerk: Charles A. Chickering
 Sergeant-at-Arms: Isaac Scott
 Doorkeeper: Michael Maher
 Stenographer: Emory P. Close

Notes

Sources
 The New York Red Book compiled by Edgar L. Murlin (published by James B. Lyon, Albany NY, 1897; see pg. 384f for senate districts; pg. 403 for senators; pg. 410–417 for Assembly districts; and pg. 505f for assemblymen)
 Biographical sketches of the members of the Legislature in The Evening Journal Almanac] (1887)

110
1887 in New York (state)
1887 U.S. legislative sessions